The Sächsische Verfassungsmedaille (Saxon Constitutional Medal) is awarded by the Free State of Saxony to persons who have rendered outstanding services to the liberal democratic development of the Free State.

It was founded in 1997 to mark the fifth anniversary of the final vote on the constitution of the Free State of Saxony and to commemorate the peaceful revolution in 1989 and is awarded annually by the president of the Landtag of Saxony, the state parliament. From 1997 to 2022, the medal was awarded to 181 people. The medal is made of silver.

Selected recipients
Source:

References

External links
 

Orders, decorations, and medals of Saxony